Agaricus placomyces is a toxic basidiomycete fungus of the genus Agaricus. It is found in North America; the Eurasian populations formerly known by the same scientific name are nowadays known as A. moelleri, while the present species may also be referred to as A. praeclaresquamosus.

Description

Agaricus placomyces has a cap that is 5–12 cm and varies from convex to broadly convex or nearly flat in age. In addition, the surface of the cap is dry and covered with brownish fibers and scales, especially over the center. Underneath, the cap can be whitish under normal environments, or pinkish in wet weather. Covered with fine, appressed greyish-brown scales and concentrated at the disc, the cap is thick, slowly becoming vinaceous when injured; the odor smells of phenol. The flesh is white, and becomes yellow when placed in KOH.

The gills of this mushroom are free from the stem, crowded, and pale grayish-pink, turning brown in age. In addition, the stem is 6–15 cm long, 1–1.5 cm. thick and more or less equal, with an enlarged base (unlike typically ending in a small bulb like Agaricus pocillator). Also, it is fairly smooth, white and bruising yellow, especially at the base, with a persistent ring, and the partial veil when still covering the gills developing brownish to yellowish droplets.

At 8–15 cm long and 2–3.5 cm thick, the stipe is slightly enlarged at the base; the surface is white, and smooth above and below the ring. The veil of the stipe is membranous, thick, white, and forms a persistent ring with a smooth upper and lower surface. The base of the stipe is typically yellow when bruised and smells of phenol.

The spores are 4–6.0 x 3.5–4.5 µm, smooth, and elliptical; the spore print is blackish-brown.

Toxicity
Agaricus placomyces contains toxins which cause gastrointestinal upset, as with other phenolic-odored Agaricus species. Some people reportedly may not be affected. The mushroom's taste is mild and its odor resembles phenol or coal tar.

Habitat
Agaricus placomyces is saprobic. In addition, it grows in groups under hardwoods and in mixed woods during summer and fall. It is generally found east of the Rocky Mountains and northern in distribution. Generally, it is solitary, living in either small groups, or clusters on disturbed ground under conifers. Unlike many other Agaricus species, it fruits from mid to late winter rather than during the late spring, summer and early fall.

See also
 List of Agaricus species

References

Sources
mushroomexpert
mykoweb
rogermushrooms

placomyces
Fungi described in 1878
Fungi of North America
Poisonous fungi
Taxa named by Charles Horton Peck